2010 in Russian football.

Club competitions
For more details, see:
2010 Russian Premier League
2010 Russian First Division
2010 Russian Second Division

Cup competitions

2009–10 Russian Cup

2010–11 Russian Cup

2010 Russian Super Cup

European club competitions

2009–10 UEFA Champions League

CSKA Moscow took second place in the group stage and enters the knockout stage.
 February 24, 2010 / First knockout round, First Leg / CSKA Moscow - Sevilla 1-1 (González  - Negredo  ) / Moscow, Luzhniki Stadium / Attendance: 28,600
PFC CSKA Moscow: Akinfeev (captain), Šemberas, Ignashevich, A. Berezutskiy, González, Krasić, Honda (Mamaev, 83), Aldonin, V. Berezutskiy , Shchennikov, Necid.
 March 16, 2010 / First knockout round, Second Leg / Sevilla - CSKA Moscow    / Seville, Estadio Ramón Sánchez Pizjuán / Attendance: 
PFC CSKA Moscow:

2009–10 UEFA Europa League

External links

 
Seasons in Russian football